Cham Surak-e Vosta (also Romanized as Cham Sūrak-e Vostá; also known as Cham Sūrag-e Vostá) is a village in Vizhenan Rural District, in the Central District of Gilan-e Gharb County, Kermanshah Province, Iran. At the 2006 census, its population was 119, in 27 families.

References 

Populated places in Gilan-e Gharb County